Taxco el Viejo (Old Taxco) is a town in Guerrero, Mexico. As of 2010, it had a population of 3,172.  It is located approximately ten kilometers south of the city of Taxco.

History
The name Taxco is most likely derived from the Nahuatl place name Tlachco, which means “place of the ballgame.” However, one interpretation has the name coming from the word tatzco which means “where the father of the water is,” due to the high waterfall near the town center on Atatzin Mountain. “De Alarcón” is in honor of writer Juan Ruiz de Alarcón who was a native of the town. Like many municipalities in central Mexico, the municipality’s coat-of-arms is an Aztec glyph. This glyph is in the shape of a Mesoamerican ballcourt with rings, players and skulls, derived from the most likely source of Taxco’s name.

Before the arrival of the Spanish in Mexico, Taxco el Viejo was known simply as "Taxco". In pre-Hispanic times, this village was the most important in the area as it was the seat of the Aztec governor who presided over tribute collection in the surrounding seven districts.  The modern Spanish city of Taxco was founded by Hernán Cortés in an area previously known as Tetelcingo.

Ex Hacienda de San Juan Bautista
The Ex Hacienda de San Juan Bautista is a colonial silver mining hacienda in Taxco el Viejo.  The first thing that makes it notable is that the main structure is built in the style of a medieval castle.  This structure was built in 1543 and was ordered by Hernán Cortés, but he never saw it built as he returned to Spain for good in 1540. His son, Martín Cortés, 2nd Marqués del Valle de Oaxaca, inherited it but he probably never set foot in it as he arrived to Mexico in 1563 and was practically deported back to Spain in 1566. Like the "El Chorrillo", it used large quantities of water and mercury to extract silver from mined ore, but this method eventually contaminated the large reserves of groundwater in this part of Guerrero.  The state is now the home of the Regional School of Earth Sciences on the Universidad Autónoma de Guerrero. This facility has a small museum with fossils and geological specimens.

References

Populated places in Guerrero
Nahua settlements